The 1893 Indiana Hoosiers football team was an American football team that represented Indiana University Bloomington as a member of the Indiana Intercollegiate Athletic Association (IIAA) during the 1893 college football season.

Schedule

References

Indiana
Indiana Hoosiers football seasons
Indiana Hoosiers football